Utricularia violacea, the violet bladderwort, is an annual, terrestrial carnivorous plant that belongs to the genus Utricularia (family Lentibulariaceae). Its native range includes Western Australia, South Australia, Victoria, and Tasmania.

See also 
 List of Utricularia species

References 

Carnivorous plants of Australia
Flora of South Australia
Flora of Tasmania
Flora of Victoria (Australia)
Eudicots of Western Australia
violacea
Lamiales of Australia
Plants described in 1810